Yelford is a hamlet in Hardwick-with-Yelford civil parish.

Manor 
In 1086 the Domesday Book records that Walter of Ponz held the manor of Yelford. Walter's other manors included Eaton Hastings, and together his manors were sometimes called the honour of Hastings. By 1221 the overlord of the manor was one Philip of Hastings. In 1651 The Hastings family sold the manor of Yelford to William Lenthall, who was Speaker of the House of Commons during the Long Parliament, Rump Parliament and First Protectorate Parliament. The manor remained in the Lenthall family until 1949.

Excavations under the hall floor in 1952 revealed pottery and bones that were dated to the 11th and 12th centuries. So the Saxon manor was probably on the same site as the current manor. The excavation went down only four feet, and it is possible that more and earlier remains still lay below. The foundations were revealed as large unmortared stones that came out as steps into the room. This was dated as very early in type - early medieval. The joint in the wall plate between the oriel and the wall of the hall was investigated with the help of the late Dr John Fletcher and declared to be late 13th century in type; much more complex than later joints and totally wind - and waterproof.

In the latter part of the 15th century the Hastings family re-built the manor house as a timber-framed building with a moat. It was altered again in about 1600, when a first floor was inserted in what until then had been the great hall and a great stone chimneystack was added. Most of the south wing was demolished in 1848, but so little of it remains that it is difficult to imagine what this was originally like. Early in the 20th century the house was divided for use by three families and by the middle of the century it was derelict. It was purchased and restored in 1952 by the Babington Smith family.  In the 1970s Jennifer Sherwood described the house as "The best, and certainly the most picturesque, large timber-framed house in the county."

Parish church 
The small Church of England parish church of Saint Nicholas and Saint Swithun may have been founded as a chapel by 1221, when Philip of Hastings was recorded as patron of the living. It was completely rebuilt in about 1500. It was restored at some time between 1869 and 1873, which may be when the bellcote was added.

Parish 
Yelford was always a small parish; in 1327, there were 16 taxpayers. By the 16th century were only 2 to 3 taxable households. By 1851 the population was only 17.  The ancient parish became a civil parish in 1866, but in 1932 it was merged with the parish of Hardwick and parts of Ducklington and Standlake to form the civil parish of Hardwick-with-Yelford.  Little is known of its history, but it is truly ancient. A mid-Acheulian hand axe was discovered around 1963 by Hugh Babington Smith beside the north wall of the church cottage. It was dated by the Ashmolean Museum to around 130,000 years ago and then gifted to The Oxfordshire Museum. Unfortunately a recent search of the museum database now shows it to be missing from the museum's records. 

Romano-British pottery has been found in two locations north of the manor, but still within the parish. There is also an Anglo-Saxon burial ground between the Yelford-Hardwick road and Westfield farm. The Black Death decimated the village in 1348–1349 and this has been evidenced by subsequent archaeological exploration. The Oxfordshire Museum has a large archive of pottery and other artifacts with the great bulk of it is early medieval up to 1350. Then there is very little until 17th century slipware, which mainly came from round the manor. The Calender of State Papers has occasional snippets of information. One of these is relevant: a court case in which Hastings was sued for cutting down oaks in Boys Wood “for mending his manor house” in the third quarter of the 15th century. (There is no record of the outcome, but Boys Wood was part of the Yelford estate in 1947.)

References

Sources

External links 

Villages in Oxfordshire
Former civil parishes in Oxfordshire